Paraplesiops bleekeri, commonly known as the eastern blue devil, blue-tipped long-fin  or Bleeker's blue devil fish, is a species of fish in the family Plesiopidae. This colourful, secretive fish is endemic to Australia, where it is a protected species.

Description
This species grows to 40 cm, and is recognizable by blue and white bands on the body, blue spots on the head, and blue dorsal and anal fins. It also has a yellow base, pectoral, and caudal fins. The pelvic, posterior dorsal, and anal fins are all elongated.

This species is a close relative of the southern blue devil (Paraplesiops meleagris), which lives in the colder southern Australian waters.

Distribution
The fish is found in coastal waters of eastern Australia between the Gold Coast of southern Queensland and Montague Island, most commonly between Sydney and Ulladulla.

Behaviour
This species is shy and secretive. Males have appeared to defend territories in caves or overhangs, where it remains to attract females and drive males away. They are most active at night.

Habitat
Paraplesiops bleekeri are benthic coastal reef inhabitants. They live inside caves, under ledges and overhangs in reefs and estuaries. They were considered to inhabit waters ranging from 3 to 30 metres in depth, and are most often encountered in shallow waters less than 20 metres, however, recent observations suggest they also inhabit offshore reefs down to at least 50 metres.

Diet
This fish is known to eat brittle stars.

Conservation status
This species is protected under the laws of New South Wales Fisheries, in particular, the Fisheries Management Act 1994. It is illegal to collect or possess them without a permit.

They are protected because of their low abundance, and their desirability in the marine aquarium industry.

Efforts to protect them have included the conservation and protection of benthic estuarine habitats, as well as rocky offshore reef areas where they breed. Some protected habitats are:
Solitary Islands Marine Park
Port Stephens – Great Lakes Marine Park
Jervis Bay Marine Park
Long Reef Aquatic Reserve
Bushrangers Bay Aquatic Reserve

Name
The specific name honours the Dutch ichthyologist and physician Pieter Bleeker (1819-1878) who named two congeners of this species.

References

Further reading
 Eschmeyer, William N., ed. 1998. Catalog of Fishes. Special Publication of the Center for Biodiversity Research and Information, no. 1, vol. 1–3. California Academy of Sciences. San Francisco, California. 2905. .
 Fetterplace, LC.; Turnbull, JW.; Knott, NA.; Hardy, NA. (2018). "The Devil in the Deep: Expanding the Known Habitat of a Rare and Protected Fish". European Journal of Ecology. 4 (1): 22–29. 
 Fenner, Robert M.: The Conscientious Marine Aquarist. Neptune City, New Jersey: T.F.H. Publications, 2001.
 Helfman, G., B. Collette y D. Facey: The diversity of fishes. Blackwell Science, Malden, Massachusetts, 1997.
 Hoese, D.F. 1986: . A M.M. Smith y P.C. Heemstra (eds.) Smiths' sea fishes. Springer-Verlag, Berlin.
 Hoese, D. F.  and R. H. Kuiter  1984. "A revision of the Australian plesiopid fish genus Paraplesiops, with notes on other Australian genera"; Records of the Australian Museum v. 36: 7–18.
 Maugé, L.A. 1986.  A J. Daget, J.-P. Gosse and D.F.E. Thys van den Audenaerde (eds.) Check-list of the freshwater fishes of Africa (CLOFFA). ISNB Brussels; MRAC, Tervuren; and ORSTOM, Paris. Vol. 2.
 Moyle, P. y J. Cech.: Fishes: An Introduction to Ichthyology, 4th edition, Upper Saddle River, New Jersey: Prentice-Hall, 2000.
 Nelson, J.: Fishes of the World, 3rd edition. New York City: John Wiley and Sons, 1994.
 Paxton, J.R., D.F. Hoese, G.R. Allen and J.E. Hanley 1989: "Pisces. Petromyzontidae to Carangidae", Zoological Catalogue of Australia, Vol. 7. Australian Government Publishing Service, Canberra, 665 pp.
 Wheeler, A.: The World Encyclopedia of Fishes, 2nd edition, London: Macdonald, 1985.

External links
Images
Images

Paraplesiops
Marine fish of Eastern Australia
Fish described in 1861
Taxa named by Albert Günther